Suiko Seamount, also called Suiko Guyot, is a guyot of the Hawaiian-Emperor seamount chain in the Pacific Ocean.

The name

Suiko Seamount was named by in 1954, and in 1967 the name was approved by the United States Board on Geographic Names. The 33rd Emperor of Japan was Empress Suiko, who reigned from 593 to 628.

Geology

The last eruption from Suiko Seamount occurred 60 million years ago, during the Paleogene Period of the Cenozoic Era.

References

Bibliography

Hawaiian–Emperor seamount chain
Hotspot volcanoes
Guyots
Seamounts of the Pacific Ocean
Paleocene volcanoes
Paleogene Oceania